Henry Gildon (by 1533 – 1592 or later), of Totnes, Devon, was an English politician.

He was a Member (MP) of the Parliament of England for Totnes in April 1554.

References

Year of death missing
English MPs 1554
Members of the Parliament of England (pre-1707) for Totnes
Year of birth uncertain